Sean Allstot (born January 15, 1983 in Grass Valley, California) is a male beach volleyball player from the United States who participated at the NORCECA Circuit 2009 at Cayman Islands playing with Kevin Lynch. They finished in the 7th position.

In the AVP Young Guns 2009, he won the bronze medal in the Manhattan Beach tournament playing with Tim Church.

He attended Cal Poly-SLO, earned a degree in kinesiology and played on the volleyball team. He is also the head coach of the Morro Bay High School boys varsity golf team.

Awards

AVP Pro Tour
 AVP Pro Tour Young Guns Manhattan Beach 2009  Bronze Medal

References

External links
 
 Sean Allstot at AVP

1983 births
Living people
People from Grass Valley, California
American men's beach volleyball players